Melanopsammella is genus of fungi within the Chaetosphaeriaceae family. It contains the species Melanopsammella gonytrichii, with all other species in this genus currently known as Chaetosphaeria.

References

External links
Melanopsammella at Index Fungorum

Sordariomycetes genera
Chaetosphaeriales